Aleksandr Tropnikov (born 1 August 1965) is a Russian and Kyrgyzstani former biathlete. He competed at the 1998 Winter Olympics and the 2002 Winter Olympics.

References

External links
 

1965 births
Living people
Kyrgyzstani male biathletes
Olympic biathletes of Kyrgyzstan
Biathletes at the 1998 Winter Olympics
Biathletes at the 2002 Winter Olympics
Sportspeople from Novosibirsk Oblast
Russian emigrants to Kyrgyzstan
Kyrgyzstani people of Russian descent